Portia Modise (born 20 June 1983) is a South African footballer who was named Player of the Championship at the 2006 Women's African Football Championship. She represented the South Africa national team at the 2012 London Olympics. She became the first African player to score 100 international goals.

Club career

Modise was born in Soweto (Meadowlands) and started playing football with the boys in her neighbourhood. She chose football ahead of netball at school, and began playing with Soweto Rangers at under-10 level. After playing for Rangers and the women's section of Jomo Cosmos, Modise moved to Soweto Ladies in 1996. She has two brothers.

Comfortable in either a midfield or forward role, Modise was nicknamed "Bashin" after the male footballer Albert "Bashin" Mahlangu. In the 2001–02 regular season, Modise scored 51 goals for Soweto Ladies, adding two more in the 4–0 National Championship final win over Cape Town Pirates.

In 2003 Modise was invited to trials with Arsenal Ladies. A dispute over sponsorship and funding left Modise and compatriots Toni Carelse and Veronica Phewa unable to sign for the English club despite impressing manager Vic Akers during the trials.

In 2005–06 Modise was employed by Orlando Pirates as an academy coach. She left after seven months in February 2006 following a disagreement with her boss Augusto Palacios.

In June 2007 Modise signed a two-year deal with Fortuna Hjørring in Denmark's Elitedivisionen, after impressing during an initial one-month contract. In South Africa she represented Orlando Pirates, Jomo Cosmos F.C. and Palace Super Falcons.

In 2009, she signed a six-month contract at Palace Super Falcons in South Africa. In 2012, she also played there.

She wasn't part of the initial training camp for the 2014 African Women's Championship squad, because she was playing 'under the radar' outside of South Africa, in deed for a men's team. After the new coach was made aware of her, she switched clubs and played for Croesus Ladies back in South Africa.

National team career
Modise was captain of the South Africa under-19 national team (Basetsane Basetsane) when she was called into the senior squad (Banyana Banyana). In the 2000 Women's African Football Championship, she featured in all South Africa's games, scoring her first goal against Zimbabwe as well as playing in the tournament final, a defeat to Nigeria which was marred by crowd violence.

In 2005, Modise was one of two African footballers, alongside Perpetua Nkwocha, to be nominated for the Women's FIFA World Player of the Year, which was won by Birgit Prinz.

At the 2006 Women's African Football Championship, she scored a goal in the third place final playing for South Africa against Cameroon, and was named Player of the Championship. She was also voted in the top three for the 2006 CAF Women's Footballer of the Year award, and was selected to play for the All-Stars squad in the match preceding the official draw for the 2007 FIFA Women's World Cup.

In November 2008 Modise announced she would no longer play for South Africa, after a breakdown in her working relationship with coach August Makalakalane. She was recalled in April 2012 by new national coach Joseph Mkhonza, after Makalakalane had been sacked amidst allegations of sexual harassment and homophobia.

Modise had 71 goals in 92 international caps heading into the 2012 Olympic football tournament. In South Africa's first match at the games, a 4–1 defeat to Sweden in Coventry, Modise scored a goal from inside the centre circle. FIFA.com reported that the "stunning" goal was acclaimed by the entire stadium, including the Swedish supporters.

October 2012 saw Modise named in the South African squad for the 2012 African Women's Championship. It was reported that she could reach her milestone 100th appearance during the tournament, should Banyana Banyana reach the semi-finals. Modise played a key role in South Africa's run to the final, where they were beaten by Equatorial Guinea.

In October 2014 Portia Modise became the first African player to reach the elusive 100-goal barrier in international football, when she scored her 99th and 100th goal in South Africa's 5–1 victory against Algeria at the CAF African Women's Championship.

On 19 May 2015, she announced her retirement from international football, after playing 124 matches and scoring 101 goals for South Africa.

International goals

Personal life
In March 2005 Ria Ledwaba, head of the women's committee at the South African Football Association (SAFA), announced plans to send players to etiquette workshops and supply tighter kit to increase their femininity. As captain of the national team Modise publicly rejected the proposals and made an outspoken attack on the committee: "We need sponsors but all the committee does is raise less important issues because they have failed to transform the sport."

During the dispute with Ledwaba, Modise had declined to reveal her own sexual orientation: "My private life is my business." In 2011, she appeared in a television documentary which highlighted the plight of lesbians in South Africa, who live in fear of "corrective rape", violence and murder. Modise told the programme makers she did not venture out alone at night: "I know how dangerous it is to live as a black lesbian in South Africa."

See also

List of women's footballers with 100 or more international goals

References

External links

 South Africa player profile

1983 births
Living people
Sportspeople from Soweto
South African women's soccer players
South Africa women's international soccer players
Expatriate men's footballers in Denmark
South African expatriate sportspeople in Denmark
Fortuna Hjørring players
Footballers at the 2012 Summer Olympics
Olympic soccer players of South Africa
South African expatriate soccer players
South African LGBT sportspeople
Lesbian sportswomen
LGBT association football players
FIFA Century Club
Women's association football midfielders
Women's association football forwards